Douglas Allan Hicks (born May 28, 1955) is a Canadian former professional ice hockey defenceman. He played for the Minnesota North Stars, Chicago Black Hawks, Edmonton Oilers, and Washington Capitals of the National Hockey League between 1974 and 1983. He later played in Europe, retiring in 1989. Doug is the brother of Glenn Hicks. He has two sons named Cody and Jesse Hicks.

Career statistics

Regular season and playoffs

External links

Profile at hockeydraftcentral.com

1955 births
Living people
Canadian ice hockey defencemen
Chicago Blackhawks players
Dallas Black Hawks players
EC Red Bull Salzburg players
Edmonton Oilers players
Flin Flon Bombers players
Hershey Bears players
HK Acroni Jesenice players
Ice hockey people from Alberta
Kölner Haie players
Minnesota North Stars draft picks
Minnesota North Stars players
National Hockey League first-round draft picks
New Brunswick Hawks players
People from Cold Lake, Alberta
Washington Capitals players